Abdul Ghani Kohli is a member of Jammu and Kashmir Legislative Assembly elected in 2014 from Kalakote in Rajouri district as a candidate of Bharatiya Janata Party. He defeated Rashpal Singh of National Conference by 6,178 votes. Kohli obtained a bachelor's degree in civil engineering from University of Kashmir in 1968.

References

Living people
Jammu and Kashmir MLAs 2014–2018
People from Rajouri district
University of Kashmir alumni
Year of birth missing (living people)
Bharatiya Janata Party politicians from Jammu and Kashmir
State cabinet ministers of Jammu and Kashmir